Stephen King is a former Gaelic footballer who played for the Cavan county team.

Playing career
He debuted for Cavan in 1980, but did not have much success in the early years, winning only a Railway Cup Medal with Ulster in 1984. In 1989, Cavan had a great run in the National Football League, claiming the Div. 2 title and reaching the semi final, only to lose narrowly to Dublin in Croke Park. In the same year he won a Dr. McKenna Cup medal when Cavan defeated Derry in the Final.  He was a member of the Cavan squad that lost out in the Ulster Finals in 1983 and 1995, but in 1997, King captained Cavan to claim their only Ulster Senior Football Championship title in 28 years, beating Derry in Clones.

International rules
He played for Ireland in the 1987 International Rules series against Australia.

External links
 1997 Ulster Final

References

Year of birth missing (living people)
Living people
Cavan inter-county Gaelic footballers
Irish international rules football players
Killeshandra Gaelic footballers